Parinaquta (Aymara parina flamingo, quta lake, "flamingo lake", hispanicized spelling Parinacota) is a lake in Peru located in the Puno Region, Chucuito Province, Kelluyo District. Parinaquta lies northeast of the lake Quraquta, near the Bolivian border.

References 

Lakes of Peru
Lakes of Puno Region